Diego Sebastián Ribas García (born 25 June 1980 in Montevideo) is a Uruguayan footballer. He last known played for Uruguay Montevideo.

He scored 2 goals in first half of 2006–07 Segunda División Uruguay.

He also scored one in 2002 Segunda División Uruguay.

External links
 tenfieldigital

Uruguayan footballers
Footballers from Montevideo
1980 births
Living people
C.A. Cerro players
Defensor Sporting players
Club Nacional de Football players
Liverpool F.C. (Montevideo) players

Association footballers not categorized by position